The okina, also called by several other names, is a unicameral consonant letter used within the Latin script to mark the phonemic glottal stop, in many Polynesian languages.

Names

Appearance 
The okina visually resembles a left single quotation mark (‘)—a small "6"-shaped mark above the baseline.

The Tahitian eta has a distinct shape, like an okina turned 90° or more clockwise.

Orthography and official status 

The okina is treated as a separate letter in the Hawaiian alphabet. It is unicameral—that is, it does not have separate uppercase (capital or majuscule) and lowercase (small or minuscule) forms—unlike the other letters, all of which are basic Latin letters. For words that begin with an okina, capitalization rules affect the next letter instead: for instance, at the beginning of a sentence, the name of the letter is written "Okina", with a capital O.

Geographic names in the United States 
The United States Board on Geographic Names lists relevant place names both with and without the okina and kahakō (macron) in the Geographic Names Information System. Colloquially and formally, the forms have long been used interchangeably.

Computer encoding

Apostrophes and quotation marks 

In the ASCII character set, the okina is typically represented by the apostrophe character ('), ASCII value 39 in decimal and 27 in hexadecimal. This character is typically rendered as a straight typewriter apostrophe, lacking the curve of the okina proper. In some fonts, the ASCII apostrophe is rendered as a right single quotation mark, which is an even less satisfactory glyph for the okina—essentially a 180° rotation of the correct shape.

Many other character sets expanded on the overloaded ASCII apostrophe, providing distinct characters for the left and right single quotation marks. The left single quotation mark has been used as an acceptable approximation to the okina, though it still has problems: the okina is a letter, not a punctuation mark, which may cause incorrect behaviour in automated text processing. Additionally, the left single quotation mark is represented in some typefaces by a mirrored "9" glyph, rather than a "6", which is unsuitable for the okina.

Unicode 

Although this letter was introduced in Unicode 1.1 (1993), lack of support for this character prevented easy and universal use for many years. , OS X, Microsoft Windows and Linux-based computers and all new major smartphones have no problem with the glyph, and it is no longer a problem in Internet Explorer 7 as it was in previous versions. U+02BB should be the value used in encoding new data when the expected use of the data permits.

The same character is sometimes used in Latin transliterations of the Hebrew letter ʻáyin and the Arabic letter ʻayn (which is not a glottal stop) as well as in the Uzbek alphabet to write the letters Oʻ (Cyrillic Ў) and Gʻ (Cyrillic Ғ). However, "okina" and other Polynesian names are properly reserved for the glottal stop in Polynesian language orthographies.

The glottal stop letter in Tahitian and Wallisian has a distinct appearance, like the turned comma rotated 90° clockwise. This glyph is not currently assigned a separate character in Unicode.

See also 
 Modifier letter apostrophe
 Glottal stop (letter)
 Saltillo (linguistics)

References

External links 
 Apple compatibility with Hawaiian added in OS 10.2
 Apple Computer Includes Hawaiian Language Support With Latest Operating System.
 Honolulu Advertiser (September 2, 2002): I mua! Macintosh 'speaks' Hawaiian
 Starbulletin (September 16, 2002): Macs upgrade to isle punctuation
 SFGate (September 9, 2002): Hawaiian language advocates applaud new Mac operating system.
 Honolulu Advertiser (June 28, 2004): Hawaiian spellings catch on, but slowly. (On slow progress in using proper Hawaiian spellings instead of makeshift English spelling.)
 Ulukau: The Hawaiian Electronic Library: Browser information for viewing Hawaiian characters
 The Okina in French Polynesian, a graphic example on the top of the page of the official website of the commune of Faa'a, capital of the French Polynesia (this explains why the INSEE still encodes it like the French apostrophe).
 Polynesian Font hints and information on encoding.

Polynesian languages
Hawaiian English
Hawaiian language
Latin-script letters
Tongic languages